The B 97 class was a class of eight destroyers built for and operated by the Imperial German Navy (Kaiserliche Marine) during the First World War. They served throughout the war, with one being lost in 1915, five being scuttled at Scapa Flow in 1919 and one being transferred to Italy, where it remained in use until 1939.

Design
As part of its 1912 construction programme, the Imperial Russian Navy placed orders for 22 large modern destroyers (the ) for its Baltic Fleet. In order to speed delivery of these ships, orders for the ship's machinery were placed overseas, including in Germany. The outbreak of the First World War, with Germany declaring war on Russia on 1 August, led to delivery of these machinery sets to be stopped. The AG Vulcan shipyard in Stettin, (now Szczecin in Poland) proposed to use this machinery to power a class of large destroyers for the Imperial German Navy, which could be built within six months. The German navy was at first unenthusiastic about Vulcan's proposal, as its torpedo flotillas consisted of smaller torpedo boats, but Admiral Alfred von Tirpitz overcame these objections, and orders for four ships were placed with Vulcan and Blohm & Voss. Two more ships were ordered from Blohm & Voss in October that year, with a final two ships being ordered in January 1915.

As the new ships were much larger than the existing torpedo craft of the German Navy, they were known as destroyers (Zerstörer) rather than torpedo boats (Torpedoboote). The two shipyards built their destroyers to slightly different designs.

Three funnels were fitted (they were the first three-funneled torpedo craft built for the German Navy). The ships' complement was 114 officers and men when the ships entered service, although this grew to 140 by the end of the war.

As built, the ships' gun armament consisted of four 8.8 cm SK L/45 naval guns in four single mounts. Six 50 cm (17.7 in) torpedo tubes were carried, with two fixed tubes just behind the ships' forecastle, and two twin tubes further aft on rotating mounts. (These mounts were splayed out at an angle of 15 degrees, unlike the twin mounts used by British destroyers.) 24 mines could be carried.

Service
All eight ships entered service during 1915. The two ships ran into several Russian destroyers, which hit V 99 with several shells. In attempting to escape, V 99 ran into a minefield and struck two mines, sinking as a result. Ships of the class took part in the Battle of Jutland, and in Operation Albion, where the Russian destroyer Grom was sunk.

As a result of the Armistice of 11 November 1918 which ended fighting between the Western Allies and Germany, much of the German High Seas Fleet was ordered in be interned at Scapa Flow in Orkney.  was employed to carry mail between Germany and the interned fleet, and it was noted that the German destroyer had poorer seakeeping than the V-class destroyers used to escort her, with the British ships able to maintain speed in rougher weather. B 98 was carrying out a mail run at the time of the scuttling, and was seized by the British when she arrived at Scapa on 22 June. Whilst under tow (possibly to Rosyth to be broken up) during poor weather B 98 broke free and was driven ashore at the bay of Lopness, Sanday, Orkney. B 98 is recorded as stranding on 17 February 1920. B 98 was largely broken up for scrap some time after her stranding. The scuttled ships were salvaged and scrapped between 1919 and 1926.

The remaining ship,  was allocated to Italy as a war reparation, transferring on 19 September 1920. The Italians re-armed the ship, replacing the four 10.5 cm guns with three 120 mm (4.7 in) guns, with one twin mount forward and a single mount aft, with two 76 mm (3 in) anti aircraft guns added and the two fixed torpedo tubes removed. She was commissioned into the Italian Navy as Cesare Rossarol on 1 December 1924. The ship had its torpedo tubes replaced by 2 twin Italian 450 mm (17.7 in) tubes in 1931, and from 1932 she was used as an experimental ship. She was stricken on 17 January 1939.

Ships

See also
German ocean-going torpedo boats of World War I

Notes

Citations

References
 

 

Destroyers of the Imperial German Navy